Flintshire Falcons Rugby League Club is a rugby league team from the county of Flintshire, North Wales. They presently play in the Wales Rugby League North Wales Championship. 

Flintshire Falcons Rugby League Club are a members-run club. They are based at Deeside Leisure Centre, Queensferry, Flintshire. There are currently over 40 playing and non-playing members varying in all ages. The club consists of a varied background of individuals, from school children and university students, through to business owners and volunteers.

History

In 2012, Flintshire Falcons joined the inaugural North Wales Conference mid-season after Montgomeryshire Marauders folded. Founded by current Chairman Mark Parry and Treasurer Mike Roberts with players mainly drawn from union clubs throughout Flintshire. Since then the club has built its Junior sections and also an U18 section which finished 3rd in the debut season in the North West Counties Youth League Division 3.

They made it to the final of the North Wales 9s in 2013 but were beaten by Conwy Celts.

Club honours

2012 North Wales Championship play-offs
2013 North Wales 9s runners-up
2013 North Wales Championship Runners Up
2014 North West Counties Youth League Division 3 3rd Place

Club history

Past Club Chairpersons

2012–Present Mark Parry

Past Club Presidents

2012-Present   Rhys Williams

Past Club Captains

2012-Present   Keiron McCombe

Representative Honours

2012   Ollie Hughes   Wales Dragonhearts
2012   Mitch Martin   Wales Dragonhearts
2014   John Ketland   Wales Dragonhearts
2014   Aled Davies    Wales Dragonhearts
2014   Dylan Rowley   Wales U18's

See also

List of rugby league clubs in Britain

References

External links

Welsh rugby league teams
Rugby clubs established in 2012
2012 establishments in Wales